{{Taxobox
| name = Brucella microti
| domain = Bacteria
| phylum = Pseudomonadota
| classis = Alphaproteobacteria
| ordo = Hyphomicrobiales
| familia = Brucellaceae
| genus = Brucella| species = B. microti| binomial = Brucella microti| species_authority = Scholz et al. 2008
}}Brucella microti is a species of bacteria first isolated from the common vole, Microtus arvalis''. Its genome has been sequenced. It is Gram-negative, non-motile, non-spore-forming, and coccoid, with the type strain CCM 4915T (=BCCN 07-01T =CAPM 6434T). It is pathogenic.

References

Further reading

Scholz, Holger C., et al. "Isolation of Brucella microti from soil." Emerging infectious diseases 14.8 (2008): 1316.

External links
LPSN

NOAA informative brochure
Type strain of Brucella microti at BacDive -  the Bacterial Diversity Metadatabase

Hyphomicrobiales
Bacteria described in 2008